This is a list of mayors of the city  Halifax, Nova Scotia. The City of Halifax is a former municipality in Nova Scotia which was amalgamated with the City of Dartmouth Town of Bedford and Halifax County to form the Halifax Regional Municipality in 1996.

This is a list of mayors for the City of Halifax from 1841 until amalgamation.  Prior to the formation of the city's elected government in 1841 the administration of the municipality was left in the hands of a selected group of men.  The first mayor was elected to council and chosen for this position by his peers in council.

Prior 1850 the mayor was elected amongst the elected councillors. The first mayor elected directly by citizens was William Caldwell. The mayor continues to act as a councillor-at-large and has a direct vote on all council decisions.

19th Century 
Stephen Binney 1841 - 1842
Edward Kenny 1842
Thomas Williamson 1842 - 1843
Alexander Keith 1843 - 1844
Hugh Bell 1844 - 1845
Andrew MacKinlay 1845 - ?1846
Joseph Jennings 1846 - 1847
William Machin Stairs 1847 - 1848
Adam Hemmeon 1848 - 1849
Henry Pryor 1849 - 1850
William Caldwell 1850 - 1851
Andrew MacKinlay 1851 - 1852
Alexander Keith 1852 - 1853
Henry Pryor 1853 - 1855
Archibald Scott 1855 - 1857
Henry Pryor 1857 - 1859
Samuel Richard Caldwell 1859 - 1861
Philip Carteret Hill 1861 - 1864
Matthew Henry Richey 1864 - 1867
Stephen Tobin 1867 - 1870
William Alexander Henry 1870 - 1871
William Dunbar 1871 - 1872
James Duggan 1872 - 1873
John Archibald Sinclair 1873 - 1875
Matthew Henry Richey 1875 - 1878
Stephen Tobin 1878 - 1881
George Fraser 1881 - 1884
James Crosskill Mackintosh 1884 - 1887
Patrick O'Mullin 1887 - 1889
David McPherson 1889 - 1892
Michael Edwin Keefe 1892 - 1895
David McPherson 1895 - 1897
Alexander Stephen 1897 - 1899

Twentieth century
James Thompson Hamilton 1899 - 1902
Adam Brown Crosby 1902 - 1905
Robert Thomas MacIlreith 1905 - 1908
Adam Brown Crosby 1908 - 1909
Joseph Andrew Chisholm 1909 - 1912
Frederick Pennington Bligh 1912 - 1915
Peter Francis Martin 1915 - 1918
Arthur Charles Hawkins 1918 - 1919
John Seakons Parker 1919 - 1922
John Murphy 1922 - 1925
Joseph Burke Kenny 1925 - 1928
Louis Amable Castonguay 1928 - 1931
George Edwin Ritchie 1931 - 1932
Albert Audley Thompson 1932 - 1934
Edward Joseph Cragg 1934 - 1937
Walter Mitchell 1937 - 1940
William Edward Donovan 1940 - 1943
John Edward Lloyd 1943 - 1945
Allan MacDougall Butler 1945 - 1946
John Edward Ahern 1946 - 1949
Gordon Stanley Kinley 1949 - 1952
Richard Alphonsus Donahoe 1952 - 1955
Leonard Arthur Kitz 1955 - 1957
Charles Augustus Vaughan 1957 - 1960
John Edward Lloyd 1960 - 1963
Charles Augustus Vaughan 1963 - 1966
Allan O'Brien 1966 - 1971
Walter Fitzgerald 1971 - 1974
Edmund L. Morris 1974 - 1980
Ronald Hanson 1980
Ronald Wallace 1980 - 1991
Moira Leiper Ducharme 1991 - 1994
Walter Fitzgerald 1994 - 1996 (¹)

Notes

(¹) W.R. Fitzgerald presided over municipal amalgamation which saw the City of Halifax combined with the City of Dartmouth, Town of Bedford and Halifax County.  Fitzgerald subsequently ran for election as mayor of the Halifax Regional Municipality and won, becoming the last mayor of the City of Halifax and the first mayor of HRM.

See also
List of mayors of the Halifax Regional Municipality 1996–present
List of mayors of Dartmouth, Nova Scotia 1873 - 1996
List of mayors of Bedford, Nova Scotia 1979 - 1996
List of wardens of Halifax County, Nova Scotia 1880 - 1996

Halifax, Nova Scotia
Mayors of Halifax
Government in Halifax, Nova Scotia
Mayors